Cris is a familiar form of the names Christopher, Cristian, Chris, Cristina.

Cris may also refer to:

Places
 Criș, the Romanian name for the river Körös in Hungary
 Criș (Târnava Mare), a tributary of the Târnava Mare in Mureș County, Romania
 Criș, a village in Daneș Commune, Mureș County, Romania

People
 Cris Cab, American singer and songwriter
 Cris (footballer, born 1977), Brazilian football player and manager
 Cris (footballer, born 1979), Brazilian footballer
 Cris (footballer, born 1980), Brazilian-born Togolese footballer
 Cris (footballer, born 1984), Portuguese footballer
 Cris (footballer, born 1985), Equatoguinean footballer
 Cris Horwang, Thai actress, model, singer and TV personality
 Cris Kirkwood (born 1960), American musician 
 Cris Ortega (born 1980), Spanish artist and writer

Others
 ETRAX CRIS, a microprocessor family from Axis Communications
 Current research information system
 Cristal (wine), or just Cris, a champagne often referenced in rap lyrics
 Centre for Railway Information Systems, for Indian railways
 European Parliament Special Committee on the Financial, Economic and Social Crisis
 Cannabinoid Research Initiative of Saskatchewan
 CrIS, Cross-track Infrared Sounder, one of the instruments aboard the Joint Polar Satellite System

See also

Criss, a given name and surname